Streptomyces prunicolor is a bacterium species from the genus of Streptomyces which has been isolated from soil in Russia. Streptomyces prunicolor produces Pironetin and the free radical scavengers benthocyanin A, benthocyanin B and benthocyanin C.

Further reading 
 
 
 
 
 
 
 }

See also 
 List of Streptomyces species

References

External links
Type strain of Streptomyces prunicolor at BacDive -  the Bacterial Diversity Metadatabase	

prunicolor
Bacteria described in 1958